Tanymecus curviscapus, is a species of weevil found in India and Sri Lanka.

Description
This species has a body length is about 4.5 to 5 mm. Body black, with dense greyish-brown scales. Laterally, the prothorax is yellowish brown. Scutellum entirely whitish. Elytra clothed with a few whitish scales. Eyes are large, oval, moderately prominent. Rostrum broad, and very shallow apex. Antennae dark piceous, with moderately stout scape. In prothorax, there is a shallow constriction closer to the apex. Elytral interspaces with large shallow separated punctures and minute scattered punctures. Elytra comparatively broad with prominent shoulders. Legs with dense grey scales.

References 

Curculionidae
Insects of Sri Lanka
Beetles described in 1916